William Stephen Childress is an American applied mathematician, author and professor emeritus at the Courant Institute of Mathematical Sciences. He works on classical fluid mechanics, asymptotic methods and singular perturbations, geophysical fluid dynamics, magnetohydrodynamics and dynamo theory, mathematical models in biology, and locomotion in fluids. He is also a co-founder of the Courant Institute of Mathematical Sciences's Applied Mathematics Lab.

Published books
 1977: Mechanics of Swimming and Flying, online .
 1978: Mathematical models in developmental biology  with Jerome K. Percus, 
 1987: Topics in Geophysical Fluid Dynamics: Atmospheric Dynamics, Dynamo Theory, and Climate Dynamics, with M. Ghil. Softcover , eBook .
 1995: Stretch, Twist, Fold: The Fast Dynamo with Andrew D. Gilbert,  
 2009: An Introduction to Theoretical Fluid Mechanics, .
 2012: Natural Locomotion in Fluids and on Surfaces Swimming, Flying, and Sliding. Edited with Anette Hosoi, William W. Schultz, Jane Wang. Hardcover , Softcover , eBook 
 2018: Construction of Steady-state Hydrodynamic Dynamos. I. Spatially Periodic Fields,

Recognition
 1976 Guggenheim Fellowship for Natural Sciences, US & Canada
 2008 Fellow of American Physical Society

References

External links
William Stephen Childress's home page

American mathematicians
Fellows of the American Physical Society
Year of birth missing (living people)
Living people